Sethi Mohallah, sometimes called Sethian Mohallah, is an old and traditionally arranged neighbourhood in the old city of Peshawar, Pakistan. The mohallah contains seven South Asian mansions built by the Sethi family that were built in a style reminiscent of Central Asia with elaborate wooden carvings. The houses were completed in the late 19th century.

Background 

The Sethis were a Hindu trader family from Punjab, who migrated from Jhelum to Peshawar in the early 19th century. They relied on local as well as international trade – their connections went as far as Russia and Central Asia. The Sethi family was involved in considerable welfare work in Peshawar and had contributed to the construction of wells for the poor, along with the Lady Reading Hospital and the Islamia College Mosque.

The downfall of the Sethis began during the Russian Revolution in 1917, when their businesses experienced setbacks from which they never recovered, forcing them to leave Central Asia and return to Peshawar.

Location 
It is situated close to the Ghanta Ghar (clock tower), Bazaar Kalan and Gor Khuttree in Peshawar's old walled city.

Design 
The homes were designed with inspiration from the vernacular architecture of Bukhara. Two neatly decorated tehkhanas (basement rooms), a balakhana (upper storey), dalaans (big halls), chinikhanas (rooms where decoration and art pieces are displayed on chimneypieces) and fountains can be found in each house. The ceilings are painted and the walls are decorated with mirror work. One of the houses has been purchased by the NWFP government, this house has two portions, one for men and one for women. The overall structure is a combination of brick and woodwork embellished with carved wooden doors and balconies. Painted and mirrored atriums provide fresh air and attractive views, while the main entrances are made of superbly carved wood.

It has 12 rooms and four basements and includes a fountain. Colourful glass ceilings with geometrical designs, woodwork with engravings of various splendid designs on walls, a big resting place, made of wood and called Takht-e-Sulaimani, to take sunshine in winter, beautiful ventilators, slanting window-shades, wooden wall cupboards, chimneys and red bricks stairs with projected wooden frames are some of the prominent features of the house.

Gallery

References

External links 
 Pictures of Mohallah Sethian Sarhad Conservation Network
 Sarhad Tourism Corporation, Government of Khyber Pakhtunkhwa

Populated places in Peshawar District
History of Peshawar
Tourist attractions in Peshawar